Albert Wright may refer to:

Albert Wright (Australian cricketer) (1875–1938), Australian cricketer
Albert Wright (cricketer, born 1899) (1899–1987), English cricketer for Northamptonshire
Albert Wright (cricketer, born 1902) (1902–1984), English cricketer for Essex
Albert Wright (cricketer, born 1941), English cricketer for Warwickshire
Harry Wright (Queensland politician) (Albert Henry Wright , 1890–1963), Australian politician, MP for the Electoral district of Bulimba, Queensland (1923–1929)
Albert Hazen Wright (1879–1970), American herpetologist

See also
Chalky Wright (1912–1957), born Albert Wright, Mexican-American featherweight boxer and world champion
Al Wright (disambiguation)
Bert Wright (disambiguation)
Charlie Wright (Kent cricketer) (1895–1959), English cricketer whose first forename was Albert